Francisco "Chiquinho" Alves Filho (born January 10, 1971) is a Brazilian Kyokushin Karateka and kickboxer. He is one of the few karate-ka to have successfully completed the 100 man kumite more than once.

He holds notable K-1 wins over Sam Greco, Andy Hug, Remy Bonjasky, Ernesto Hoost, Peter Aerts and Stefan Leko.

Career
Francisco Filho started Kyokushin kaikan around age of 10 and received black belt six and half years later. He made his professional K-1 fighting debut on July 20, 1997 at the K-1 Dream '97 tournament against Kyokushin and Seidokaikan fighter Andy Hug. This was their second encounter, the first being at the 5th Kyokushin World Tournament in 1991 that resulted in a controversial knockout victory for Filho with a technique that connected after the bell rang. The second fight was also won by Filho quickly earning the Brazilian a large fan base in Japan as well as making him one of the then top contenders for the K-1 World GP Championship title. 

Filho has since held championship titles in both K-1 as well as in IKO Kyokushinkaikan. He has not taken part in any major competition since 2004 but remains active developing young fighters and in overseeing Brazil’s Kyokushin national team.

In 2012, he appeared on The Ultimate Fighter: Brazil coaching with Vitor Belfort.

Titles and accomplishments
Kickboxing
2001 K-1 World Grand Prix Runner Up
2001 K-1 World Grand Prix in Fukuoka Repechage A Champion
2000 K-1 World GP in Yokohama Champion
Kyokushin
1999  7th Kyokushin World Open Karate Tournament IKO 1 (defeated Hajime Kazumi)
1997  1st Kyokushin World Weight Tournament Heavyweight
1995  6th Kyokushin World Open Karate Tournament IKO 1 (lost to Hajime Kazumi)
1995  Brazilian Open
1994  Mundialito Open
1994  7th South American Championships
1993  Brazilian Open
1992  6th South American Championships
1992  Brazilian Open
1991 5th Kyokushin World Open Karate Tournament final 16 (lost to Kenji Yamaki)
1991  Uruguayan Open Karate Championships
1990  Paulista Championships
1990  Brazilian Open
1989  5th South American Championships
1989  Paulista Championships
1988  Paulista Championships Juniors
1988 Brazilian Open 6th place
1987 Brazilian Open 7th place
1987  Paulista Championships Juniors
1986  Paulista Championships Juniors
1985  Paulista Championships Juniors
 In 1995 Fancisco Filho completed 100 man kumite in Brazil and in Japan.

Kickboxing record

|-  bgcolor="#CCFFCC"
| 2004-05-30 || Win ||align=left| Remy Bonjasky || Kyokushin vs K-1 2004 All Out Battle || Tokyo, Japan || Decision (Unanimous) || 3 || 3:00 || 16-7-2
|-  bgcolor="#CCFFCC"
| 2003-12-31 || Win ||align=left| Toa || K-1 PREMIUM 2003 Dynamite!! || Tokyo, Japan || Decision (Unanimous) || 3 || 3:00 || 15-7-2
|-  bgcolor="#FFBBBB"
| 2003-10-11 || Loss ||align=left| Stefan Leko || K-1 World Grand Prix 2003 Final Elimination || Osaka, Japan || Decision (Unanimous) || 3 || 3:00 || 14-7-2
|-  bgcolor="#c5d2ea"
| 2003-07-13 || Draw ||align=left| Mike Bernardo || K-1 World Grand Prix 2003 in Fukuoka || Fukuoka, Japan || Decision draw || 5 || 3:00 || 14-6-2
|-  bgcolor="#FFBBBB"
| 2001-12-18 || Loss ||align=left| Mark Hunt || K-1 World Grand Prix 2001 Final || Tokyo, Japan || Ext R Decision (Unanimous) || 4 || 3:00 || 14-6-1
|-
! style=background:white colspan=9 |
|-
|-  bgcolor="#CCFFCC"
| 2001-12-18 || Win ||align=left| Alexey Ignashov || K-1 World Grand Prix 2001 Semi Finals || Tokyo, Japan || Decision (Unanimous) || 3 || 3:00 || 14-5-1
|-  bgcolor="#CCFFCC"
| 2001-12-18 || Win ||align=left| Peter Aerts || K-1 World Grand Prix 2001 Quarter Finals || Tokyo, Japan || TKO (Corner stoppage) || 2 || 3:00 || 13-5-1
|-  bgcolor="#CCFFCC"
| 2001-10-08 || Win ||align=left| Lloyd van Dams || K-1 World Grand Prix 2001 in Fukuoka Final || Fukuoka, Japan || Ext.R Decision (Majority) || 4 || 3:00 || 12-5-1
|-
! style=background:white colspan=9 |
|-
|-  bgcolor="#CCFFCC"
| 2001-10-08 || Win ||align=left| Sergei Ivanovich || K-1 World Grand Prix 2001 in Fukuoka Semi Finals || Fukuoka, Japan || Decision (Unanimous) || 3 || 3:00 || 11-5-1
|-  bgcolor="#FFBBBB"
| 2001-08-11 || Loss ||align=left| Sergei Ivanovich || K-1 World Grand Prix 2001 in Las Vegas Quarter Finals || Las Vegas, Nevada || Ext.R Decision (Unanimous) || 4 || 3:00 || 10-5-1
|-  bgcolor="#FFBBBB"
| 2000-12-10 || Loss ||align=left| Ernesto Hoost || K-1 World Grand Prix 2000 Semi Finals || Tokyo, Japan || Decision (Unanimous) || 3 || 3:00 || 10-4-1
|-  bgcolor="#CCFFCC"
| 2000-12-10 || Win ||align=left| Stefan Leko || K-1 World Grand Prix 2000 Quarter Finals || Tokyo, Japan || Ext.R Decision (Unanimous) || 4 || 3:00 || 10-3-1
|-  bgcolor="#CCFFCC"
| 2000-08-20 || Win ||align=left| Cyril Abidi || K-1 World Grand Prix 2000 in Yokohama Final || Yokohama, Japan || TKO (Corner stoppage) || 2 || 0:25 || 9-3-1
|-
! style=background:white colspan=9 |
|-
|-  bgcolor="#CCFFCC"
| 2000-08-20 || Win ||align=left| Matt Skelton || K-1 World Grand Prix 2000 in Yokohama Semi Finals || Yokohama, Japan || KO (Right punch) || 2 || 2:42 || 8-3-1
|-  bgcolor="#CCFFCC"
| 2000-08-20 || Win ||align=left| Tsuyoshi Nakasako || K-1 World Grand Prix 2000 in Yokohama Quarter Finals || Yokohama, Japan || Decision (Unanimous) || 3 || 3:00 || 7-3-1
|-  bgcolor="#FFBBBB"
| 2000-04-23 || Loss ||align=left| Jérôme Le Banner || K-1 The Millennium || Yokohama, Japan || KO (Left straight cross) || 1 || 2:02 || 6-3-1
|-  bgcolor="#CCFFCC"
| 1999-04-25 || Win ||align=left| Ernesto Hoost || K-1 Revenge '99 || Yokohama, Japan || KO (Right hook) || 1 || 1:37 || 6-2-1
|-  bgcolor="#FFBBBB"
| 1998-12-13 || Loss ||align=left| Mike Bernardo || K-1 Grand Prix '98 Final Round Quarter Finals || Tokyo, Japan || KO (Right overhand) || 3 || 2:35 || 5-2-1
|-  bgcolor="#CCFFCC"
| 1998-09-27 || Win ||align=left| Rick Roufus || K-1 World Grand Prix '98 Opening Round || Osaka, Japan || KO (Right low kick) || 3 || 0:15 || 5-1-1
|-
! style=background:white colspan=9 |
|-
|-  bgcolor="#CCFFCC"
| 1998-07-18 || Win ||align=left| Peter Aerts || K-1 Dream '98 || Nagoya, Japan || TKO (Cut Shin) || 1 || 3:00 || 4-1-1
|-  bgcolor="#c5d2ea"
| 1998-04-09 || Draw ||align=left| Ray Sefo || K-1 Kings '98 || Yokohama, Japan || Decision Draw || 5 || 3:00 || 3-1-1
|-  bgcolor="#FFBBBB"
| 1997-11-09 || Loss ||align=left| Ernesto Hoost || K-1 Grand Prix '97 Final Semi Finals || Tokyo, Japan || Decision (Majority) || 3 || 3:00 || 3-1
|-  bgcolor="#CCFFCC"
| 1997-11-09 || Win ||align=left| Sam Greco || K-1 Grand Prix '97 Final Quarter Finals || Tokyo, Japan || KO (Right hook) || 1 || 0:15 || 3-0
|-  bgcolor="#CCFFCC"
| 1997-09-07 || Win ||align=left| Duane Van Der Merwe || K-1 Grand Prix '97 1st Round || Osaka, Japan || KO (Spinning back kick) || 1 || 2:22 || 2-0
|-
! style=background:white colspan=9 |
|-
|-  bgcolor="#CCFFCC"
| 1997-07-20 || Win ||align=left| Andy Hug || K-1 Dream '97 || Nagoya, Japan || KO (Right hook) || 1 || 2:37 || 1-0
|-
| colspan=9 | Legend:

See also
List of K-1 events
List of K-1 champions
List of male kickboxers

References

1971 births
Living people
Brazilian male kickboxers
Heavyweight kickboxers
Brazilian male karateka
Brazilian practitioners of Brazilian jiu-jitsu
Sportspeople from Bahia
Brazilian expatriates in Japan
Kyokushin kaikan practitioners